These are the complete results of the 2014 European Team Championships Super League on 21 and 22 June 2014 in Braunschweig, Germany. As with the previous championships there were a couple of rules applying specifically to this competition, such as the limit of three attempts in the throwing events, long jump and triple jump (only the top four were allowed the fourth attempt) and the limit of four misses total in the high jump and pole vault.

Two athletes, Quentin Bigot of France and Rutger Koppelaar of the Netherlands, were later found guilty of doping use. Their results were subsequently annulled and the points readjusted which cost France the third place and the bronze medal. Later more athletes from Russia and Turkey were found out to be doping and subsequently disqualified. The results of these athletes were also annulled but the reallocation of points did not change the position of any team.

Final standings

Men

100 metres
Wind:Heat 1: -0.3 m/sHeat 2: +0.7 m/s

200 metres

Wind:Heat 1: +1.2 m/sHeat 2: +2.0 m/s

400 metres

800 metres

1500 metres

3000 metres

5000 metres

3000 metres steeplechase

110 metres hurdles

Wind:Heat 1: -1.1 m/sHeat 2: +1.0 m/s

400 metres hurdles

4 × 100 metres relay

4 × 400 metres relay

High jump

Pole vault

Long jump

Triple jump

Shot put

Discus throw

Hammer throw

Javelin throw

Women

100 metres
Wind:Heat 1: -2.9 m/sHeat 2: -0.9 m/s

200 metres

Wind:Heat 1: +1.3 m/sHeat 2: +1.2 m/s

400 metres

800 metres

1500 metres

3000 metres

5000 metres

3000 metres steeplechase

100 metres hurdles

Wind:Heat 1: -0.4 m/sHeat 2: +1.8 m/s

400 metres hurdles

4 × 100 metres relay

4 × 400 metres relay

High jump

Pole vault

Long jump

Triple jump

Shot put

Discus throw

Hammer throw

Javelin throw

References 
 Results

European Athletics Team Championships Super League
European
2014 in German sport
International athletics competitions hosted by Germany
Sport in Braunschweig